John Bird or Berde (by 1481–1542 or later), of Bath, Somerset, was an English politician.

He was a Member (MP) of the Parliament of England for Bath in 1529.

References

15th-century births
16th-century deaths
English MPs 1529–1536
People from Bath, Somerset